The 2015 Campeonato Nacional Apertura Scotiabank  was the 97th Chilean League top flight, in which Colo-Colo won its 31st league title.

Scores

Standings

Liguilla Pre-Copa Sudamericana
Following the conclusion of the regular season, the teams placed 2nd to 5th advanced to the Liguilla in order to determine the "Chile 1" spot to the 2016 Copa Sudamericana.

Semifinals

Universidad Católica won 3–2 on aggregate.

Palestino won 3–1 on aggregate.

Finals

Universidad Católica won 5–3 on aggregate and qualified for the 2016 Copa Sudamericana.

References

External links
2015 Torneo Apertura at Soccerway

2015–16 Campeonato Nacional season
2015–16 in Chilean football
2015 in South American football leagues
Primera División de Chile seasons